Alex Lutz (born 24 August 1978) is a French actor, comedian and director. He is best known for his role of Catherine in La revue de presse de Catherine et Liliane in Le Petit Journal.

Theater
He has worked with comedians like Malik Bentalha, Pierre Palmade, Michèle Laroque, Jean-Loup Dabadie, Sylvie Joly, Audrey Lamy in different plays and one man shows as a comedian or director.

Filmography

Actor

Director / Writer

References

External links

 

1978 births
21st-century French male actors
French male film actors
French male stage actors
French male television actors
Living people
Mass media people from Strasbourg
Actors from Strasbourg